Karel Zahradnik (1848–1916) was a renowned Czech mathematician at the University of Zagreb. In his 23 years of productive activity in Zagreb he wrote several significant scholarly works, mainly concerned with algebraic curves.

Further reading
Life and Work of Karel Zahradnik (1848–1916)

Czech mathematicians
1848 births
1916 deaths
Academic staff of the University of Zagreb